Sheyenne National Grassland is a National Grassland located in southeastern North Dakota in the United States, comprising  of public land amid  of privately owned land in a region of sandy soils in the vicinity of the Sheyenne River in Ransom and Richland Counties. It is the only National Grassland in the tallgrass prairie region of the U.S.  The grassland provides habitat for the largest population of greater prairie chickens in North Dakota, as well as the Dakota skipper butterfly, the western prairie fringed orchid, and numerous ferns, as well as grazing land for approximately  83 cattle ranchers.

A  segment of the North Country National Scenic Trail crosses the Grassland from east to west and is open to hiking, horseback riding, and mountain biking.  Find a map and trail information at https://northcountrytrail.org/dpc/.

The grassland is administered by the Forest Service as part of the Dakota Prairie Grasslands from offices in Bismarck, North Dakota. There are local ranger district offices in Lisbon.

References

External links
 Dakota Prairie Grassland: Special places -U.S. Forest Service
 Map showing dispersed camping areas and motor vehicle accessibility

National Grasslands of the United States
Protected areas of Ransom County, North Dakota
Protected areas of Richland County, North Dakota
Grasslands of North Dakota